The Portage River is an  tributary of the Moose Horn River in eastern Minnesota, United States.  It flows west to the Moose Horn River, joining it at Moosehead Lake next to the city of Moose Lake. By the Moose Horn River, its waters flow to the Kettle River, St. Croix River, and ultimately the Mississippi River. Just to the east of the Portage River, Nemadji Creek flows east to the Nemadji River, a tributary of Lake Superior and part of the Saint Lawrence River basin.

The Portage River was on an old portage route, hence the name.

See also
List of rivers of Minnesota

References

External links
Minnesota Watersheds
USGS Hydrologic Unit Map - State of Minnesota (1974)

Rivers of Minnesota
Rivers of Carlton County, Minnesota